Barilius pakistanicus is a fish in genus Barilius of the family Cyprinidae.

References 

Pakistanicus
Fish described in 1978